The Polizia Penitenziaria (in English, "Penitentiary Police"), formally the Corpo di Polizia Penitenziaria, is a law enforcement agency in Italy which is subordinate to the Italian Ministry of Justice and operates the Italian prison system as corrections officers. Vatican City, an independent state, does not have a prison system, so the Vatican sends convicted criminals to the Italian prison system.

According to Interpol, this force (as part of the Ministry of Justice) has a "nationwide remit for prison security, inmate safety and transportation".

History

The Polizia Penitenziaria was formed in 1990 to replace the former Corpo degli Agenti di Custodia. Professionalization and demilitarization were motives for creating the new organisation.

Operations 
The Polizia Penitenziaria carries out the functions of the Judicial Police, Public Safety, Traffic Police and Corrections. They support other law enforcement agencies, such as with traffic roadblocks (known as a controllo).

The Polizia Penitenziaria is one of the four national police forces of Italy (along with the Carabinieri, the Polizia di Stato and the Guardia di Finanza), with each force performing a slightly different function.

Weapons
The Polizia Penitenziaria are an armed police force, like most Italian police forces and it uses a variety of firearms and weapons for self-defence:

Berreta 92FS (pistol)
HK MP5 (sub-machine gun)
Beretta PM 12 (sub-machine gun)

Uniform

As a national, civilian police force, the uniform and insignia is similar to other Italian police forces, with historical, service and seasonal variations, as well as rank

Principally, there are:

Ordinary winter uniform - everyday uniform; blue trousers & blue tunic, white shirt & tie, black leather gloves, peaked/bowler caps, pistol holster worn from left bottom pocket flap
Ordinary summer uniform - everyday uniform; blue trousers & blue tunic, white shirt & tie, peaked/bowler caps, pistol holster worn from left bottom pocket flap, no gloves
Winter Service uniform - same as above, but with a light blue beret for males & females, instead of peaked/bowler caps
Summer Service uniform - same as above, but with lighter fabric tunic and no gloves
Reduced Summer Service uniform - the tunic is removed and replaced with a short-sleeve, collared blue shirt, with rank worn on the shoulder boards.
Armed uniform - same as service uniform, but with a belt over the top of the tunic, with pistol and other equipment, worn with light blue beret only
Operational uniform - training and operations work, outdoor style uniform with beret, with winter jacket
Reduced operational uniform (summer months) - training and operations work, outdoor style uniform with beret, but with short-sleeve polo shirt and without jacket
Public order/riot control uniform - disorder
Uniform for Honour Services - Officer and Executive ranks - blue tunic and trousers, peaked/bowler cap, blue shoulder sash, officer sword/sabre, white plain belt, white gaiters, white gloves
Uniform for Honour Services - non officer ranks -  blue tunic and trousers, peaked/bowler cap, white plain belt, white gaiters, blue cords, white gloves
Uniform for Parade Services - Officer and Executive ranks - the same as Uniform for Honour Services, but with light blue beret rather than peaked or bowler cap
Uniform for Parade Services - non officer ranks - - the same as Uniform for Honour Services, but with light blue beret rather than peaked or bowler cap, no cords and white full webbing with double shoulder belts, often with a sub-machine gun (MP5 or PM 12)
Marine section uniform - marine/naval work
Canine (dog) section uniform - for canine agents
Motorcyclist uniform - for motorcycle duties
Mounted section uniform

Uniforms are then further split along the lines of:

Rank - some uniforms will rarely be worn by more senior officers and the insignia and accompliments on each uniform, will differ according to rank.
Season (weather) - e.g. shirt sleeves, polo shirts, capes, coats, etc.

The type of uniform worn depends also on the duty being carried out. E.g. office work, or prison landing work, or armed exterior patrols, or riots, all require different uniform and equipment.

Notes 
The aiguillette (lanyard on tunic) changes with the role.
For more senior officers (executives, inspectors etc) they carry their individual weapon (pistol) in a special internal holster in black leather, under the flap of the tunic.

Recruiting
The Polizia Penitenziaria recruits his members through an open, public and competitive exam which is announced by the Ministry of Justice. A quote of the available working posts can be reserved by law to the promotion of internal workers or people who have contracted a permanent and irreversible infirmity in the fulfillment of their duty. An analogue right could be reserved to their more proximate relatives.

Until the approval of the ordinary law n. 225 of August 23, 2004, the selection was open to any Italian civil citizen who had the requisites for absolving the military service. Those people had the right to absolve it directly within the Polizia Penitenziaria, after having passed the public exam for the qualification as an auxiliary agent. The selection was reserved to the Italian male residents who were eligible for the military service.

From 1 January 2005 to 31 December 2016, the working positions, which had been object of public selection, were reserved to volunteers who had a conscription in the Italian Armed Forces for one year (VFP1) or for four years (VFP4). On January 1, 2017, the public selections were newly open to civil citizens and a share of 40% of the available working roles began to be reserved to them. The psycho-physical requisites were the same fixed by the Decree of Italian President of Republic n. 904, which had come into force on 23 December 1983.

As of July 2021, the winners of the public exam have to frequent and pass an additional formative course whose duration ranges from around a year for the auxiliary agents to 24 months for the police commissioners. The latter position is solely accessible by people who are graduated with a 5-years degree in Jurisprudence or analogue degree titles.

Gallery

See also

Gruppo Sportivo Fiamme Azzurre
Law enforcement in Italy

References

External links

Polizia Penitenziaria official website 
Dipartimento dell'Amministrazione Penitenziaria official website  (Archive)

 
Prisons in Italy
National law enforcement agencies of Italy